2-Fluoromethamphetamine (2-FMA) is a stimulant drug of the amphetamine family which has been used as a designer drug . 2-FMA is commonly compared to lisdexamfetamine (Vyvanse), and dextroamphetamine due to its efficacy as a study or productivity aid. 2-FMA is purported to produce somewhat less euphoria than comparable amphetamines, likely due to its main mechanism of action consisting of norepinephrine reuptake inhibition.

Chemistry 
2-Fluoromethamphetamine is fluorinated analogue of methamphetamine, and is a regioisomer of 3-FMA and 4-FMA.

It does not activate the serotonin receptors, including 5-HT2A, unlike most stimulant drugs of the amphetamine family.

Legal status

Canada 
As of 1996, 2-FMA is a controlled substance in Canada, due to being an analog of methamphetamine.

China
As of October 2015, 2-FMA is a controlled substance in China.

Germany
As of 13 December 2014, 2-FMA is a controlled substance in Germany. It is controlled under Anlage I BtMG (Narcotics Act, Schedule I). Substances controlled under Anlage I BtMG are illegal to manufacture, possess, import, export, buy, sell, procure or dispense it without a license. Violations of the law are punishable by a fine or imprisonment for up to five years.

Ukraine

As of July 2019, 2-FMA is a controlled substance in Ukraine (considered a narcotic).

United States 
As a close analog of scheduled controlled substance, sale or possession of 2-FMA could be potentially be prosecuted under the Federal Analogue Act.

See also 
 2-Fluoroamphetamine
 3-Fluoromethamphetamine
 3-Fluoroethamphetamine
 4-Fluoromethamphetamine
4-Fluoroamphetamine
 2-Methoxymethamphetamine (methoxyphenamine)

References 

Designer drugs
Methamphetamines
Fluoroarenes
Norepinephrine-dopamine releasing agents
Organofluorides